The SS Western Reserve was a propeller lake freighter that was constructed in 1890 by the Cleveland Shipbuilding Company for Peter G. Minch, a ship's captain and operator who was pioneering the industrialization of bulk carrier freight service on the Great Lakes.  She had a length of 301 feet, a beam of 41 feet and drew 21 feet of water.  She and a ship of similar dimensions and building history, the SS W.H. Gilcher, were two of the first lake freighters to be constructed out of steel plate.  Her steel construction made it possible for the vessel to carry heavier loads of freight than her wooden rival steamships.    

The Western Reserve foundered on August 30, 1892, in Lake Superior.  She had been traveling upbound in ballast to Two Harbors, a port serving the Minnesota iron ranges, for a load of iron ore.  Of the 32 officers, men, and passengers aboard, 31 were lost and there was but one survivor, wheelsman Harry Stewart.  Stewart made land on a desolate stretch of shoreline between Grand Marais and Deer Park on the Upper Peninsula of far northern Michigan, and lived.  The list of those lost included the ship's owner, Peter Minch.  Upon being debriefed, Stewart's description of the metal fatigue and structural failure of the 1.5-year-old lake vessel created almost conclusive evidence that the shipbuilders had improperly used brittle steel contaminated with sulfur and phosphorus.  Coverage by The New York Times of the disaster was headlined: "The Steamer Broke in Two."  Eight weeks after the Western Reserve disaster, the W.H. Gilcher - which had been built at the same time with similar mill runs of steel plate - disappeared on northern Lake Michigan.  The disasters, loss of life of seamen and a well-known shipowner, and ensuing scandal led to permanent changes in the types of steel approved for use in U.S. and Canadian shipbuilding. Despite several searches, the wreck of the Western Reserve has never been located.

RMS Titanic
Similar changes were not made to British law, which continued to allow the use of brittle steel in shipbuilding after 1892. Examples of British shipbuilding art included the White Star Line's transatlantic liner , built in Belfast by shipbuilder Harland and Wolff.  Titanic entered service in April 1912 and sank that month on her maiden voyage after striking an iceberg in the Atlantic Ocean. After the sunken liner was discovered and samples were taken of her rivets and hull plates, forensic engineers reported that the non-ductility of the iron and steel used to build her could have played a significant role in speeding up its structural failure after Titanic hit the iceberg.  Meanwhile, in the United States and Canada in the first half of the twentieth century, lake freighters built with the improved standards for steel were bumping through Great Lakes ice floes and suffering damage, but not sinking.

References

1890 ships
Maritime incidents in 1892
Shipwrecks of Lake Superior
Ships built in Cleveland
Great Lakes freighters
Missing ships